Lithgow is a town in the Central Tablelands of New South Wales, Australia and is the administrative center of the City of Lithgow local government area. It is located in a mountain valley named Lithgow's Valley by John Oxley in honour of William Lithgow, the first Auditor-General of New South Wales.

At June 2021 Lithgow had an estimated urban population of 21,556.
Lithgow is surrounded by a varied landscape characterised by seven valleys which include national parks, one of which, the Blue Mountains National Park, is a World Heritage Area. The Wollemi National Park is home to the Jurassic-age tree the Wollemi Pine, which was found growing in a remote canyon in the park.

Location

The city sits on the western edge of the sandstone country of the Blue Mountains and is usually considered the first true country town west of Sydney. Immediate surrounding areas include the old mining hamlet of Vale of Clwydd and Oakey Park, a famous iron and steel village, of which fiery night scenes have been depicted in many paintings, as well as large areas of bush and state forest.

Lithgow is in the NSW State electorate of Bathurst, while federally it is part of electorate of Calare. Lithgow benefits from being the western terminus for the electric section of the Main Western railway line from Sydney, and of NSW TrainLink's Blue Mountains Line electric services. Lithgow is home to the iconic zig-zag railway.

History

The mountainous terrain of the Blue Mountains and the expense of building long tunnels required the construction of the Lithgow Zig Zag between 1866 and 1869. The line was opened as far as Bowenfels, just to the west, in 1869, but Lithgow station was not opened until 1877. Although it was superseded in 1910 by more modern engineering methods, including ten tunnels, parts of the Zig Zag have been developed into a popular tourist attraction. Following a period of industrialisation in the late 1860s and 1870s, the town of Lithgow boomed during the 1880s, and it was incorporated as a borough in 1889.

The town situated in the centre of a coal mining district and there is one coal-powered power station nearby. It is the site of Australia's first commercially viable steel mill, the ruins of which are open for inspection at "Blast Furnace Park". Due to the abundance of coal and relative proximity to Sydney, in the areas surrounding Lithgow is one of the largest power stations in NSW, the Mount Piper Power Station. The Wallerawang Power Station closed in 2014 and was subsequently demolished. The (now demolished) Lithgow Power Station was operational from 1928 to 1964.

Heritage listings 

Lithgow has a number of heritage-listed sites, including the following listed on the New South Wales State Heritage Register:
 Bent Street: Lithgow Valley Colliery and Pottery Site
 Brewery Lane: Lithgow Zig Zag
 Gas Works Lane: Lithgow Coal Stage Signal Box
 Inch Street: Lithgow Blast Furnace
 70 Inch Street: Eskbank House
 Jenolan Caves Road: McKanes Falls Bridge
 Main West Line 156.334 km, James Street: Lithgow Underbridge
 Main Western railway: Eskbank railway station, New South Wales
 Main Western railway: Ten Tunnels Deviation
 Railway Parade: Lithgow railway station
 Top Points Zig Zag railway: Cooerwull railway footbridge

In addition, the following sites were listed on the (now defunct) Register of the National Estate:

 Former Station Master's Residence (now Caddie's Restaurant), a sandstone cottage designed by John Clifton and built in 1869
 Eskbank House, Bennett Street, built by Thomas Brown in 1842
 Lithgow Valley Pottery Site Kiln, 1875 to 1908
 Lithgow Court House, corner Bridge and Mort Streets, a brick building in the Arts and Crafts style
 La Salle Cottage (formerly Cooerwull Academy), Rabaul Street, a stone building in the Victorian Gothic Revival style, built circa 1882
 Methven, Lidsdale Road, a sandstone house built by Andrew Brown in the 1870s
 Lithgow Small Arms Factory

Lithgow was also the location of an alleged assassination attempt on the life of Queen Elizabeth II in 1970.

Climate
Lithgow features a subtropical highland climate (Köppen climate classification Cfb) with warm summers, cool to cold winters and generally steady precipitation year-round. Despite its location on highlands, Lithgow manages to have 90.3 clear days annually.

Lithgow is one of the few Australian cities to see snow, although snowfall is rarely in significant quantities due to the rain shadow brought about by the ranges to the west of the city. One major event was the late season snowfall in October 2014, where 20 centimetres of snow fell.

Iron and steel industry

In 1848, iron smelting began in Mittagong, Australia. It proved unprofitable for the remainder of the 19th century. This situation remained until the early 20th century when no iron ore was being smelted. The only iron being cast was by William Sandford in Lithgow. His works were bought by G. & C. Hoskins in 1907, who had previously been making iron pipes in Sydney. The Lithgow works acquired a reputation for industrial disputes.

Retail 
Lithgow's range of both small and major retailers include:

 Woolworths - supermarket
 Aldi - supermarket
 Bunnings Warehouse - hardware store
 Harvey Norman -  home appliance and furniture store
 Dimmeys - discount department store

Lithgow has one major shopping centre, Lithgow Valley Plaza. With over 500 parking spaces, the Plaza has two anchor stores and over 30 specialty retailers including:

 Target - discount department store
 Coles - supermarket
 Liqourland - liquor store associated with Coles Group
 The Reject Shop - discount variety store
 Australia Post - national postal service
 EB Games - video game entertainment software retailer

The Lithgow District Chamber of Commerce has been providing advocacy, events and services for local retailers and the economy of Lithgow and the surrounding towns and villages since 2015.

Tourist attractions

Lithgow is adjacent to a number of national parks and other attractions. Places to visit include the Zig Zag Railway, Glow Worm Tunnel, Newnes in the Wolgan Valley and Glen Davis in the Capertee Valley, the second largest canyon in the world.

Other attractions include the Hartley Historic Site, Lithgow Small Arms Factory Museum, State Mine Heritage Park and the Eskbank House Museum. Lithgow is also close to Jenolan Caves, which are a World Heritage Area and lie to the south of Lithgow.

The most popular tourist event in Lithgow is Ironfest (Lithgow), an annual cultural heritage event that attracts over 10,000 visitors. Ironfest hosts the annual St George's Day Jousting Tournament which involves contestants from all around the world. The festival also features a colonial battle re-enactment, called the 'Battle of Lithgow' which involves over 120 participants, kitted out in fully authentic 19th century apparel, and involving cavalry, infantry and artillery. As well as these two historical re-enactment events Ironfest includes historical & auto displays, blacksmith demonstrations, art exhibitions, workshops and demonstrations, as well as live music and performances.

The Lithgow Greyhound Racing Club was established in 1928  and its Saturday race meetings are also a popular tourist attraction. The annual feature event is the Lithgow Golden Muzzle held every December, which is sponsored by the Lithgow Workers Club.

Media
Electronic media in Lithgow is represented by commercial radio stations 2LT and Move FM operated by Midwest Radio Network, public broadcasters ABC and SBS, and commercial networks Prime7, WIN and Southern Cross 10, 7two, 7mate, 9Gem, 9Go!, 10 Bold and 10 Peach.

There is a free fortnightly paper - The Central West Village Voice. The Lithgow Mercury is a newspaper published weekly.

Notable residents
 Robert Bartlett - rugby league and lawn bowls player.
 Andrew Brown - the first European settler of the Lithgow Valley and a prominent industrialist and philanthropist.
 Albert Burdus - Australian rugby league player
 Cardinal Edward Clancy  (1923-2014) - the seventh Roman Catholic Archbishop of Sydney, Australia (1983 to 2001) was born in Lithgow.
 Joseph Cook (1860-1947) - English Australian politician, resident of Lithgow and member for Hartley, and Parramatta. Sixth Prime Minister of Australia.
 John Doyle a comedian of the duo Roy and HG, was born in Lithgow.
 Wayde Egan - rugby league player for the Penrith Panthers and the New Zealand Warriors.
 Ean Griffiths - rapper that goes by the name of Top Dawg and is known for his hit song 'Cripwalk on you haterz" 
 Roy Heffernan - Professional Wrestler, Tag Team Champions The Fabulous Kangaroos, Mr Australia was born in Lithgow 1925.
 Nancy Hill - Australian basketball player.
 Charles Hoskins - an industrialist significant in the development of the iron and steel industry, lived at the former home of William Sandford, from 1908 to 1912.
 Marjorie Jackson-Nelson  - a former athlete and Olympic gold medalist ("The Lithgow Flash") and later, Governor of South Australia, was raised in Lithgow.
 Nina Eva Vida Jones (1882–1966) - a socialite and motor racing driver, married to John Alexander Stammers Jones (1870-1933), brewer of Lithgow.
 Leon Morris (1914-2006) - Theologian and New Testament Scholar.
 Laurie Oakes - journalist, was educated at Lithgow High School, being dux in 1961.
 David Palmera champion squash player, was born in Lithgow.
 Ben Reynolds - Australian rugby league player.
 Marty Roebucka former Australian rugby union Wallabies fullback, was born in Lithgow.
William Sandford (1841–1932) - industrialist and pioneer of the iron and steel industry, lived at 'Eskroy Park', now part of the clubhouse of the Lithgow Golf Club, from 1890 to 1908.
 Jordan ShanksAustralian comedian/YouTuber
 William John Truscott (1886-1966) - Footballer for the East Fremantle Football Club from 1913 to 1927.

See also

 Lithgow Ironfest
 Lithgow Small Arms Factory
 Jenolan Caves
 Blue Mountains (New South Wales)
 Zig Zag Railway

References

External links

 
 Lithgow Tourism Information
 VISITNSW.com - Lithgow
 Map of Lithgow, New South Wales on OpenStreetMap

 
Cities in New South Wales
Communities in the Blue Mountains (New South Wales)
Mining towns in New South Wales
Central Tablelands